Nikos Zapropoulos (born 27 July 1978) is a Greek footballer who last played for Levadiakos F.C. in the Beta Ethniki.

Zapropoulos began his professional career by signing for Xanthi in July 1997. He appeared in 145 Alpha Ethniki matches for the club over nine seasons. He also played for Ergotelis and Panthrakikos in the Alpha Ethniki.

References

External links
Profile at Onsports.gr

1978 births
Living people
Greek footballers
Greek expatriate footballers
Super League Greece players
Cypriot First Division players
Xanthi F.C. players
Ergotelis F.C. players
PAS Giannina F.C. players
Panthrakikos F.C. players
Thrasyvoulos F.C. players
Panserraikos F.C. players
Levadiakos F.C. players
Anorthosis Famagusta F.C. players
Expatriate footballers in Cyprus
Association football defenders
Footballers from Katerini